"The Gift of the Magi" is a short story by O. Henry first published in 1905.

The Gift of the Magi may also refer to:


Musical theatre
The Gift of the Magi, a 1958 musical by Richard Adler
The Gift of the Magi, a 1995 musical by Mark St. Germain and Randy Courts

Opera
The Gift of the Magi (Rautavaara opera), 1994
The Gift of the Magi (Conte opera), 1997

Other uses
Gifts of the Magi (gold, frankincense and myrrh) presented to Jesus
"Mickey and Minnie's Gift of the Magi", the third segment of the film Mickey's Once Upon a Christmas
"Gift of the Magi", a composition by Tommy Banks from the album The Holiday Season
"The Gift of the Magi" (Fargo), an episode of Fargo

See also
"Grift of the Magi", an episode of The Simpsons